William Te Winkle (born June 30, 1954) is a former member of the Wisconsin State Senate.

Biography
Te Winkle was born in Sheboygan, Wisconsin. He graduated from Sheboygan North High School before graduating magna cum laude from Hope College and from the University of Wisconsin Law School. Te Winkle became a member of the Phi Beta Kappa Society and Pi Sigma Alpha. Later, he served as an instructor at Lakeshore Technical College. He is married with two children.

Political career
Te Winkle was a member of the Senate during the 1987 and 1989 sessions. Previously, he chaired the Sheboygan County, Wisconsin Democratic Party.

References

People from Sheboygan, Wisconsin
Democratic Party Wisconsin state senators
Wisconsin lawyers
Hope College alumni
University of Wisconsin Law School alumni
1954 births
Living people